Kanuparthi Varalakshmamma (1896–1978) was an activist of the Indian Freedom Movement.

Life sketch
Varalakshmamma was born to Palaparthi Seshayya and Hanumayamma on 6 October 1896 in Bapatla, one of seven boys and three girls. She married Kanuparthi Hanumantha Rao in 1909. Her husband supported in her activities wholeheartedly, as stated by of Varalakshmamma by Polapragada Rajyalakshmi in her Biography of Kanuparti Varalakshmamma (Sahitya Akademi).

Starting at the age of 12, she was involved in the Indian freedom movement and a follower of Mahatma Gandhi. She worked towards improving the lot of women and encouraged them to actively participate in the freedom movement. She died on 13 Aug 1978.

Literary and social activities
Varalakshmamma started her literary career with a series of articles in 1920, under a running title, Maa Chettuneeda Muchatlu, (Chatting in the shade of our tree), published in the Andhra Patrika weekly. In this column, Varalakshmamma discussed important issues such as education for women, traditions, politics and current trends in various areas. The popular column ran for six years.

In 1928 Veralakshmamma started a column in the new magazine, Gruhalakshmi. Her new column, Sarada Lekhalu (శారద లేఖలు)(Letters from Sarada) was under the pseudonym Sarada. The letters were addressed to an imaginary friend, Kalpalata. In these letters, Varalakshmamma discussed  issues such as the Sharda Act, divorce law, the khadi movement, non-cooperation, erasing untouchability, unfounded customs, physical exercise, the changes implemented in measurements and weights and microphones.

She started a women's organization, Stree Hitaishini Mandali to promote women's education, vocational skills and to improve their social status.

Varalakshmamma wrote poetry, stories, novels, and plays. Her writings were broadcast on All India Radio and Doordarshan (India TV). She participated in literary meets with high-ranking poets of the time. Varalakshmamma's first novel Vasumati was published in 1925. Her second novel, Viswamitra was published in 1933.

Some of her stories are Kuteeralakshmi (The Goddess in a Cottage), Penshanu Puccukunna Naati Raatri (The night after retirement), Katha Etla Undaale (What is a good story!) and Aidu Maasamula Iruvadi Dinamulu (Five months and twenty days).

References

 Varalakshmamma. Vasumati (a novel) https://archive.org/details/vasumati00varasher
 Varalakshmamma. Viswamitra (novel) https://archive.org/details/viswamitramahari026142mbp

External sources
 Rajyalakshmi, Polapragada.(200) Kanuparthi Varalakshmamma. New Delhi: Sahitya Akademi.
 Varalakshmamma. Kuteeralakshmi, translated into English. 
 Comprehensive article on Varalakshmamma 
 A comprehensive article on Varalakshmamma in Telugu 

1890s births
1978 deaths
People from Guntur district
Telugu women writers
Telugu writers
20th-century Indian women writers
Indian women short story writers
20th-century Indian short story writers
Indian independence activists from Andhra Pradesh
Writers from Andhra Pradesh
19th-century Indian women
19th-century Indian people
Women writers from Andhra Pradesh